Joanie Gillingham (born 21 February 1961) is a Canadian rower. She competed in the women's eight event at the 1984 Summer Olympics.

References

External links
 

1961 births
Living people
Canadian female rowers
Olympic rowers of Canada
Rowers at the 1984 Summer Olympics
People from Twentynine Palms, California